Cadets is a 1939 German historical war film directed by Karl Ritter and starring Mathias Wieman, Carsta Löck, and Andrews Engelmann. The film is set in 1760, against the backdrop of the Austro-Russian Raid on Berlin during the Seven Years' War. It depicts a group of Prussian cadets holding off superior Russian forces.

Because of its anti-Russian theme the film was pulled from release in 1939 following the Molotov–Ribbentrop Pact. It was put on general release in December 1941, once Germany and the Soviets were at war.

The film is loosely connected to the Prussian film cycle of historical epics.

Cast

References

Bibliography

External links

1939 films
1930s war drama films
1930s historical films
German war drama films
German historical films
German children's films
Films of Nazi Germany
1930s German-language films
Films directed by Karl Ritter
Films set in Berlin
Films set in 1760
Nazi propaganda films
Seven Years' War films
Prussian films
German black-and-white films
Films set in boarding schools
UFA GmbH films
1939 drama films
1930s German films